Simon Charles Hopkinson (born 5 June 1954) is an English food writer, critic and former chef. He published his first cookbook, Roast Chicken and Other Stories, in 1994.

Early life
Hopkinson was born in Greenmount, Bury, in 1954, the son of a dentist father and a mother who taught art at Bury Grammar School. At the age of eight he was awarded a chorister's scholarship to St John's College School in Cambridge. At 13 he moved to Trent College, near Nottingham.

Early career 

Hopkinson started his career at the age of 17 in the kitchens of Le Normandie in Birtle, near Bury, Lancashire, under the supervision of Yves Champeau. Following on from this, in 1978 he became the youngest chef to acquire an Egon Ronay Guide star with his restaurant the Shed in Dinas in Pembrokeshire, West Wales.

He spent the next two and a half years as an Egon Ronay inspector. He returned to London, and, after a three-year stint as a private chef, he was installed at Hilaire, which opened in Old Brompton Road in 1983. A friendship with the Conrans led to the establishment of Bibendum in 1987, where he worked as the chef and joint proprietor with Sir Terence Conran and the late Lord Paul Hamlyn.

Bibendum 

Bibendum was created out of the abandoned Michelin House on Fulham Road, which served as Michelin's UK headquarters from 1911 to 1985. Inside the restaurant, Hopkinson continued his philosophy of well-judged simple cooking which he garnered from his influences Richard Olney, Jane Grigson and Elizabeth David.

He also began a cookery column in The Independent and in 1994 his first book, Roast Chicken and Other Stories (co-authored with Lindsey Bareham), was published. It later won a Glenfiddich Food and Drink Award. In 2005, it was voted "Most Useful Cookbook of All Time" by Waitrose Food Illustrated magazine.

Also in 1994, Hopkinson suffered what he termed a "mini-breakdown" during restaurant service one evening. He left Bibendum early in 1995 to devote his time to cookery writing. He was replaced as the head chef by Matthew Harris.

Television
In June 2011, Hopkinson presented his cooking show The Good Cook, every Friday after The One Show on BBC. The series consisted of 6 episodes, being frequently repeated on BBC Two and some excerpts used on BBC One's Saturday Kitchen. From June 2013, Hopkinson has presented a new show called Simon Hopkinson Cooks on Channel 4's digital channel More4.

Bibliography

Books
Roast Chicken and Other Stories, 1994
 Sweetbreads, Liver and Kidneys, 1997
Gammon and Spinach, Macmillan, 1998
 The Prawn Cocktail Years (with Lindsey Bareham), 1997
Second Helpings of Roast Chicken, Random House, 2006
Week In Week Out, Quadrille, 2007
The Bibendum Cookbook (with Terence Conran and Matthew Harris), Octopus Books, 2008
The Vegetarian, Option, Abrams, 2009
The Good Cook, Ebury Publishing, 2012
Simon Hopkinson Cooks, Random House, 2013

Articles

References

External links 
 
 Simon Hopkinson Website Official Site
 The Good Cook – with Simon Hopkinson
 BBC One - The Good Cook, Episode 1 The Good Cook, programme 1

 Claude Bosi – Bibendum Biography from Bibendum's website
 This man is the best cook in Britain 'This man is the best cook in Britain', Jan Moir 2005

1954 births
Living people
People from Bury, Greater Manchester
Writers from Lancashire
English chefs
English food writers
British restaurant critics
British cookbook writers
20th-century British writers
21st-century British writers
Television personalities from Lancashire
English television personalities
English restaurateurs
English television chefs
People educated at Bury Grammar School
Country Life (magazine) people